The M939 is a 5-ton 6×6 U.S. military heavy truck. The basic cargo versions were designed to transport a  cargo load over all terrain in all weather. Designed in the late 1970s to replace the M39 and M809 series of trucks, it has been in service ever since. The M939 evolved into its own family of cargo trucks, dump trucks, semi-tractors, vans, wreckers, and bare chassis/cabs for specialty bodies. 44,590 in all were produced.

History 
In the late 1970s the M809 series 5-ton (4,536 kg)  6x6 trucks, based on a 1949 design, were becoming old and mechanically dated. It was still a useful type, with 35,000 in service. A "Product Improvement Package" was developed to rebuild and update the M809 series into the M939 series. A new cab and hood are spotting features, but there were also other improvements.

In 1982 AM General, who built all M809s, began rebuilding M809s into the M939 and M939A1 series at their South Bend, Indiana plant. They would rebuild 24,100. A follow-up model, the all-new M939A2 series, was produced by Bowen-McLaughlin-York/BMY in Marysville, Ohio. They would build 20,490. In 1991 the M939 series was replaced by the all-new design M1083-M1091 Medium Tactical Vehicles.

Specifications 

All models of the M939 share a common basic chassis, cab, hood, and fenders. The basic truck is a 6×6 (three axles, six wheels, all of which are powered) heavy truck. Early M939s were rebuilds of M809 vehicle chassis with a new automatic transmission, transfer cases, cab, and hood. Suffix –A2 are new production with later model Cummins engine. The vehicles have a wide variety of configurations and weights.

Note that the motor and tire specifications, along with other improvements, apply to the A2 versions (and A1 versions) of each base model listed below. There is an M928, an M928A1, and M928A2.

Engines 
This was the standard engine of the M809 series. The M939A2 models use a newer and smaller Cummins 6CTA8.3  turbocharged inline 6 cylinder diesel engine developing  at 2100 rpm and  torque at 1,500 rpm.

Driveline 
By 1980 fewer soldiers knew how to shift manual transmissions and heavy-duty automatic transmissions had matured so the M809's manual was replaced with an Allison MT654CR 5-speed automatic. This is easier to drive, shifts better, and has less shock to the chassis than a manual transmission.

The M809 had an unusual 2-speed transfer case that engaged the front axle automatically, a more modern and conventional model was used. It could shift between low and high ranges while moving. In the low range the front axle is automatically engaged, in the high range the driver controls it.

The M809 series used Rockwell-Standard double-reduction axles with a 6.44:1 ratio. New production M939A2 use a similar Meritor model, also with a 6.44:1 ratio. Steering boxes and some other components have also changed. Entire components are interchangeable but the component parts are different.

Chassis 
A ladder frame with three beam axles, the front on leaf springs, the rear tandem on leaf springs with locating arms, was used.

The M939 series uses 11:00 R20 tires with two tires per side per axle in the rear (rear tandem duals). This allows a heavy load to be carried on improved roads and most US trucks in the past have used them. The M939A1 and M939A2 series instead use oversized 14:00 R20 tires with a single tire on each side per axle, still with a tandem setup. Single, larger tires in a line (having the same track) work better and get stuck less often on soft ground. M939A2 series vehicles use a central tire inflation system (CTIS).

There are three wheelbases (measurements are from the centerline of the front axle to the centerline of the rear tandem).

The M809 series had an unusual air-over-hydraulic braking system, The M939 series have a commercial type air-brake system modified for military service.

Models

Cargo Truck M923-M928 

The M923 (M925 w/winch) was the standard cargo version of the series. It had a  body with drop sides so it could be loaded from the side by forklifts. It had a bottom hinged tailgate. Side racks, troop seats, and overhead bows with a canvas cover were standard.

There was no drop side version. Side racks and overhead bows with a canvas cover were standard but no troop seats were fitted.

Dump Truck M929/M930 

The M929 (M930 w/winch) was a dump truck used to haul sand, gravel, dirt, rubble, scrap, and other bulk materials. It had a dump body with cab protector and a tailgate that could hinge at either the top or bottom. They could be equipped with overhead bows, tarpaulin, and troop seats, but the relatively small size of the body limited their passenger or cargo load.

Tractor Truck M931/M932 

A front-mounted winch was optional. Unlike commercial trucks the fifth-wheel could also pivot side to side, making a more flexible connection to the trailer. Even so, off-road performance was limited.

Expansible Van M934/M935 

The M934 (M935 with a hydraulic lift-gate) had a  van body with a slide out section on each side. The body could support  of communications equipment.

Medium Wrecker M936 

The M936 was a wrecker used to recover disabled or stuck trucks and lift large components. Although the truck was not meant to carry a load, the boom could support  when towing. They had  front and  rear winches, outriggers, boom braces, and special extra-heavy duty rear springs for stability. Chains, chocks, block and tackle, oxygen-acetylene torches, and other automotive tools were carried.

Chassis-cabs 

The M939 to M945 were chassis with cabs, meant to carry specialized bodies. They were available in long and extra long wheelbases, and with or without front winches. The largest was the M945 used for Ribbon Bridge transporter bodies

Dimensions

Gallery

Operators

Safety 
The safety of the M939 series of trucks has been criticized, especially braking performance and stability when loaded. In 1999 the U.S. Army began retrofitting anti-lock brake systems to the M939 trucks. Until the trucks were modified, they were limited to a  top speed by an Army-wide safety order.

Prior to that improvement, 26% of all Army vehicle accidents and 53% of all Army vehicle accident fatalities were in M939 series trucks. From 1987 to 1998 the series made up 9% of the total U.S. Army vehicle inventory, but accounted for 34% of all fatal accidents.

The problem seemed to be that the torque converter would "lock up" in 2nd gear, and would not unlock easily. When the driver attempted to brake hard, often in a sudden or 'panic' stop, and accidentally locked the brakes (no wheel movement, tires skidding), this would kill the engine; this also killed the power steering, and the driver would suddenly be unable to steer. Too often, the truck would veer sideways and either hit something or roll over.

See also 
 Heavy Expanded Mobility Tactical Truck (HEMTT)
 Palletized Load System (PLS)
 M54 5-ton 6x6 truck
 M809 series 5-ton 6x6 truck
 Medium Tactical Vehicle Replacement (MTVR)

References 

 
 
    and

External links 

 M939 series at NSN Lookup
 M939 Technical Manuals at Liberated Manuals.com

Military trucks of the United States
Military vehicles introduced in the 1980s
Six-wheeled vehicles